Valentina Võssotskaja (born 28 May 1944 in Baku) is an Estonian engineer-technologist and politician. She was a member of IX Riigikogu.

In 1967, she graduated from Azerbaijan State Oil Academy.

She has been a member of United People's Party of Estonia.

References

Living people
1944 births
Members of the Riigikogu, 1999–2003
Women members of the Riigikogu
Estonian People's Party politicians
People from Baku
21st-century Estonian women politicians